Sukkot is a Torah-commanded holiday celebrated for seven days, beginning on the 15th day of the month of Tishrei. It is one of the Three Pilgrimage Festivals on which those Israelites who could were commanded to make a pilgrimage to the Temple in Jerusalem. In addition to its harvest roots, the holiday also holds spiritual importance with regard to its abandonment of materialism to focus on nationhood, spirituality, and hospitality, this principle underlying the construction of a temporary, almost nomadic, structure of a sukkah.

The names used in the Torah are Chag HaAsif, translating to "Festival of Ingathering" or "Harvest Festival," and Chag HaSukkot, translating to "Festival of Booths." This corresponds to the double significance of Sukkot. The one mentioned in the Book of Exodus is agricultural in nature—"Festival of Ingathering at the year's end"—and marks the end of the harvest time and thus of the agricultural year in the Land of Israel. The more elaborate religious significance from the Book of Leviticus is that of commemorating the Exodus and the dependence of the People of Israel on the will of God. It is also sometimes called the "Feast of Tabernacles" or Feast of Booths.

The holiday lasts seven days in the Land of Israel and eight in the diaspora. The first day (and second day in the diaspora) is a Shabbat-like holiday when work is forbidden. This is followed by intermediate days called Chol Hamoed, when certain work is permitted. The festival is closed with another Shabbat-like holiday called Shemini Atzeret (one day in the Land of Israel, two days in the diaspora, where the second day is called Simchat Torah). Shemini Atzeret coincides with the eighth day of Sukkot outside the Land of Israel.

The Hebrew word  is the plural of sukkah, "booth" or "tabernacle", which is a walled structure covered with s'chach (plant material, such as overgrowth or palm leaves). A sukkah is the name of the temporary dwelling in which farmers would live during harvesting, reinforcing agricultural significance of the holiday introduced in the Book of Exodus. As stated in Leviticus, it is also reminiscent of the type of fragile dwellings in which the Israelites dwelled during their 40 years of travel in the desert after the Exodus from slavery in Egypt. Throughout the holiday, meals are eaten inside the sukkah and many people sleep there as well.

On each day of the holiday it is a mitzvah, or commandment, to perform a waving ceremony with the Four Species, as well as to sit in the sukkah during the holiday.

Origins

The earliest references in the Bible ( & ) make no mention of Sukkot, instead referring to it as "the festival of ingathering (hag ha'asaf) at the end of the year, when you gather in the results of your work from the field," suggesting an agricultural origins. (The Hebrew term asaf is also mentioned in the Gezer calendar as a two-month period in the autumn.) 

The booths aspect of the festival may come from the shelters that were built in the fields by those involved in the harvesting process. Alternatively, it may come from the booths which pilgrims would stay in when they came in for the festivities at the cultic sanctuaries. Finally,  talks about the taking of various branches (and a fruit), this too is characteristic of ancient agricultural festivals, which frequently included processions with branches.

Over time, the festival was historicized by symbolic connection with the desert sojourn of exodus. However, it has been noted by both ancient and modern scholars that the narratives of the exodus trek never place the Israelites in booths.

Laws and customs
Sukkot is a seven-day festival. Inside the Land of Israel, the first day is celebrated as a full festival with special prayer services and holiday meals. Outside the Land of Israel, the first two days are celebrated as full festivals. The seventh day of Sukkot is called  ("Great Hoshana", referring to the tradition that worshippers in the synagogue walk around the perimeter of the sanctuary during morning services) and has a special observance of its own. The intermediate days are known as Chol HaMoed ("festival weekdays"). According to Halakha, some types of work are forbidden during Chol HaMoed. In Israel many businesses are closed during this time.

Throughout the week of Sukkot, meals are eaten in the sukkah. If a brit milah (circumcision ceremony) or Bar Mitzvah rises during Sukkot, the seudat mitzvah (obligatory festive meal) is served in the sukkah. Similarly, the father of a newborn boy greets guests to his Friday-night Shalom Zachar in the sukkah. Males awaken there, although the requirement is waived in case of drought. Every day, a blessing is recited over the Lulav and the Etrog.
Keeping of Sukkot is detailed in the Hebrew Bible (and ); the Mishnah (Sukkah 1:1–5:8); the Tosefta (Sukkah 1:1–4:28); and the Jerusalem Talmud (Sukkah 1a–) and Babylonian Talmud (Sukkah 2a–56b).

Dwelling in Sukkah 

The sukkah walls can be constructed of any material that blocks wind (wood, canvas, aluminum siding, sheets). The walls can be free-standing or include the sides of a building or porch. There must be at least two and a partial wall. The roof must be of organic material, known as s'chach, such as leafy tree overgrowth, schach mats or palm fronds – plant material that is no longer connected with the earth. It is customary to decorate the interior of the sukkah with hanging decorations of the four species as well as with attractive artwork.

Prayers 

Prayers during Sukkot include the reading of the Torah every day, reciting the Mussaf (additional) service after morning prayers, reciting Hallel, and adding special additions to the Amidah and Grace after Meals. In addition, the service includes rituals involving the Four Species. The lulav and etrog are not used on the Sabbath.

Hoshanot
On each day of the festival, worshippers walk around the synagogue carrying the Four Species while reciting special prayers known as Hoshanot. This takes place either after the morning's Torah reading or at the end of Mussaf. This ceremony commemorates the willow ceremony at the Temple in Jerusalem, in which willow branches were piled beside the altar with worshippers parading around the altar reciting prayers.

Ushpizin and Ushpizata

A custom originating with Lurianic Kabbalah is to recite the ushpizin prayer to "invite" one of seven "exalted guests" into the sukkah. These ushpizin (Aramaic  'guests'), represent the "seven shepherds of Israel": Abraham, Isaac, Jacob, Moses, Aaron, Joseph and David, each of whom correlate with one of the seven lower Sephirot (this is why Joseph, associated with Yesod, follows Moses and Aaron, associated with Netzach and Hod respectively, even though he precedes them in the narrative). According to tradition, each night a different guest enters the sukkah followed by the other six. Each of the ushpizin has a unique lesson to teach that parallels the spiritual focus of the day on which they visit, based on the Sephirah associated with that character.

Several lists of seven have been proposed. The Ushpizata are sometimes coidentified with the seven prophetesses of Judaism: Sarah, Miriam, Deborah, Hannah, Abigail, Hulda, and Esther. Some lists seek to relate each female leader to one of the Sephirot, to parallel their male counterparts of the evening. One such list (in the order they would be invoked, each evening) is: Ruth, Sarah, Rebecca, Miriam, Deborah, Tamar, and Rachel.

Chol HaMoed intermediate days 

The second through seventh days of Sukkot (third through seventh days outside the Land of Israel) are called Chol HaMoed ( –  "festival weekdays"). These days are considered by halakha to be more than regular weekdays but less than festival days. In practice, this means that all activities that are needed for the holiday—such as buying and preparing food, cleaning the house in honor of the holiday, or traveling to visit other people's sukkot or on family outings—are permitted by Jewish law. Activities that will interfere with relaxation and enjoyment of the holiday—such as laundering, mending clothes, engaging in labor-intensive activities—are not permitted.

Religious Jews often treat Chol HaMoed as a vacation period, eating nicer than usual meals in their sukkah, entertaining guests, visiting other families in their sukkot, and taking family outings. Many synagogues and Jewish centers also offer events and meals in their sukkot during this time to foster community and goodwill.   

On the Shabbat which falls during the week of Sukkot (or in the event when the first day of Sukkot is on Shabbat), the Book of Ecclesiastes is read during morning synagogue services in the Land of Israel. (Diaspora communities read it the second Shabbat {eighth day} when the first day of sukkot is on Shabbat.) This Book's emphasis on the ephemeralness of life ("Vanity of vanities, all is vanity...") echoes the theme of the sukkah, while its emphasis on death reflects the time of year in which Sukkot occurs (the "autumn" of life). The penultimate verse reinforces the message that adherence to God and His Torah is the only worthwhile pursuit. (Cf. Ecclesiastes 12:13,14.)

Hakhel assembly 

In the days of the Temple in Jerusalem, all Israelite, and later Jewish men, women, and children on pilgrimage to Jerusalem for the festival would gather in the Temple courtyard on the first day of Chol HaMoed Sukkot to hear the Jewish king read selections from the Torah. This ceremony, which was mandated in Deuteronomy 31:10–13, was held every seven years, in the year following the Shmita (Sabbatical) year. This ceremony was discontinued after the destruction of the Temple, but it has been revived in Israel since 1952 on a smaller scale.

Simchat Beit HaShoevah water-drawing celebration 

During the intermediate days of Sukkot, gatherings of music and dance, known as Simchat Beit HaShoeivah (Celebration of the Place of Water-Drawing), take place. This commemorates the celebration that accompanied the drawing of the water for the water-libation on the Altar, an offering unique to Sukkot, when water was carried up the Jerusalem pilgrim road from the Pool of Siloam to the Temple in Jerusalem.

Hoshana Rabbah (Great Supplication) 

The seventh day of Sukkot is known as Hoshana Rabbah (Great Supplication). This day is marked by a special synagogue service in which seven circuits are made by worshippers holding their Four Species, reciting additional prayers. In addition, a bundle of five willow branches is beaten on the ground.

Shemini Atzeret and Simchat Torah 

The holiday immediately following Sukkot is known as Shemini Atzeret ( "Eighth [Day] of Assembly"). Shemini Atzeret is usually viewed as a separate holiday. In the Diaspora a second additional holiday, Simchat Torah ("Joy of the Torah"), is celebrated. In the Land of Israel, Simchat Torah is celebrated on Shemini Atzeret. On Shemini Atzeret people leave their sukkah and eat their meals inside the house. Outside the Land of Israel, many eat in the sukkah without making the blessing. The sukkah is not used on Simchat Torah.

Sukkot in the generations of Israel

Jeroboam's feast 
Jeroboam feared that continued pilgrimages from the northern kingdom to Jerusalem could lead to pressure for reunion with Judah:

Nehemiah

Hannukah

In Christianity

Sukkot is celebrated by a number of Christian denominations that observe holidays from the Old Testament. These groups base this on the belief that Jesus celebrated Sukkot (see the Gospel of John 7). The holiday is celebrated according to its Hebrew calendar dates. The first mention of observing the holiday by Christian groups dates to the 17th century, among the sect of the Subbotniks in Russia.

Academic views
De Moor has suggested that there are links between Sukkot and the Ugaritic New Year festival, in particular the Ugaritic custom of erecting two rows of huts built of branches on the temple roof as temporary dwelling houses for their gods.

Some have pointed out that the original Thanksgiving holiday had many similarities with Sukkot in the Bible.

See also
 List of harvest festivals
 Sukkah City – a 2010 public art and architecture competition planned for New York City's Union Square Park
 Ushpizin, 2004 film
 Shkinta

Notes

References

Further reading

External links

Jewish

General
 Thetorah.com - Sukkot
 Encyclopædia Britannica - Sukkot
 Jewish Encyclopedia - Sukkot
 Jewish Virtual Library – Jewish Holidays: Sukkot
 My Jewish Learning: Sukkot 101

By branch of Judaism
 Reform Judaism: Sukkot Reform Judaism
 The Rabbinical Assembly: Sukkot Conservative Judaism
 Orthodox Union – Jewish Holidays: Sukkot Orthodox Judaism
 Chabad.org: Sukkot & Simchat Torah Hasidic Judaism
 Reconstructing Judaism: Sukkot Reconstructionist Judaism
 Sukkot – Society for Humanistic Judaism Humanistic Judaism
 The Karaite Jews of America: Sukkot Karaite Judaism

Christian
 Sukkot: The Season of our Joy – The Feast of Tabernacles

 
Autumn festivals
Autumn traditions
Hallel
Harvest festivals
September observances
October observances
Tishrei observances
Hebrew words and phrases in the Hebrew Bible
Hebrew words and phrases in Jewish law